Boniface of Savoy may refer to:

Boniface, Count of Savoy (1244–1263)
Boniface of Savoy (bishop) (1217–1270), Archbishop of Canterbury